Omar Mukhtar Street is the main street of Gaza City, in the State of Palestine, running from Palestine Square to the Port of Gaza in the Rimal district, separating the Old City's al-Daraj and Zaytoun quarters. Gaza's hotel strip is a part of Omar Mukhtar Street and most of Gaza's most important buildings are located along the street. Built during World War I by Ottoman governor Jamal Pasha, the street was originally named after him. However, following the ouster of Ottoman forces from Palestine in 1917, Gaza's city council headed by Fahmi al-Husseini named the street after Omar Mukhtar, a Libyan revolutionary leader.

The British Mandatory Palestine turned Omar Mukhtar Street into a main street in 1937, using the zoning plan of the urban planner, Henry Kendall.

Important buildings

Great Mosque of Gaza
Welayat Mosque
Public Library of Gaza
Palestinian Centre for Human Rights
Gaza Municipal Hall
Saint Porphryrius Church
Gold Market (Souk ad-Dahab)
Souk al-Fras
PLO Flag Shop
Yazji Supermarket
Rashad Shawwa Cultural Centre

References

Streets in Gaza City
Streets in the State of Palestine